Bangalaia wissmanni is a species of beetle in the family Cerambycidae. It was described by Quedenfeldt in 1888, originally under the genus Sternotomis. It is known from the Democratic Republic of the Congo and Angola.

Varietas
 Bangalaia wissmanni var. confluens (Lepesme, 1952)
 Bangalaia wissmanni var. lanei (Heath, 1905)

References

Prosopocerini
Beetles described in 1888